Václav Míka (born 1 June 2000) is a Czech professional footballer who plays for MFK Chrudim, on loan from Viktoria Plzeň.

Club career
He made his Czech First League debut for Viktoria Plzeň on 6 February 2021 in a game against Slovan Liberec.

References

External links
 

2000 births
Living people
Czech footballers
Czech Republic youth international footballers
Association football defenders
FC Viktoria Plzeň players
Czech First League players
Czech National Football League players
MFK Chrudim players